Henryk Tomaszewski (pronounced tom-a-SHEV-ski) (June 10, 1914 – September 11, 2005) was an award-winning poster artist and the "father" of the Polish Poster School.

Biography

Henryk Tomaszewski was born in Warsaw, Poland on June 10, 1914, to a family of musicians.

In 1934, he enrolled in the Warsaw Academy of Fine Arts and graduated in 1939. During World War II and the Nazi occupation of Poland, Tomaszewski earned a living through his painting, drawings, and woodcuts which were later destroyed during the Warsaw Uprising. In 1947, he began creating posters for state-run film distribution agency Central Wynajmu Filmow with fellow designers Tadeusz Trepkowski and Tadeusz Gronowski. Postwar shortages of supplies made Tomaszewski rework film posters and introduced bold colors, abstract shapes, and filmmaking techniques to convey the film's mood rather than rely on portraits of the film's stars. He also created posters for the circus and art exhibitions, among others. His poster designs were animated and witty, leading him to become the "father" of the Polish Poster School in the postwar era influencing international poster designers. His work was also part of the painting event in the art competition at the 1948 Summer Olympics.

He became a professor from 1952 until 1985 at the Warsaw Academy of Fine Arts.

In 1975 Henryk Tomaszewski was granted the title of Honorary Royal Designer for Industry by Royal Society of Arts in London and since 1957 was a member of Alliance Graphique International (AGI).

Tomaszewski was the father of acclaimed contemporary Polish graphic artist Filip Pagowski.

He died on September 11, 2005, in Warsaw, Poland of progressive nerve degeneration.

Major awards
1948 - Five Golds Medals, International Poster Exhibition, Vienna (Austria)
1963 - First Prize, International Biennal of Arts, São Paulo (Brazil)
1965 - Gold Medal, Leipzig (DDR)
1966 - Silver Medal, International Poster Biennal, Warsaw (Poland)
1967 - Gold Medal, National Polish Poster Biennal, Katowice (Poland)
1970 - Gold Medal, International Poster Biennal, Warsaw (Poland)
1975 - Silver Medal, National Polish Poster Biennal, Katowice (Poland)
1975 - HonRDI, Royal Designers for Industry
1979 - First Prize, 3rd Poster Biennale, Lahti (Finland)
1981 - First Prize, International Poster Exhibition, Fort Collins (USA)
1986 - Excellence Award, ICOGRADA
1988 - Silver and gold medals, International Poster Biennal, Warsaw (Poland)
1991 - Bronze Medal, International Poster Triennial, Toyama (Japan)
1994 - Silver Medal, International Poster Triennial, Toyama (Japan)
1994 - Bronze Medal, International Poster Biennal, Warsaw (Poland)

See also
Graphic design
List of graphic designers
List of Polish painters
List of Polish graphic designers

References

External links
 Profile of Henryk Tomaszewski at Culture.pl

1914 births
2005 deaths
Polish graphic designers
Polish cartoonists
Polish illustrators
Polish poster artists
Artists from Warsaw
Academy of Fine Arts in Warsaw alumni
Olympic competitors in art competitions
Recipients of the State Award Badge (Poland)